All Saints University School of Medicine, Dominica (ASUDOM) is a private medical school located in the Caribbean. The schools' campus is in Roseau, Dominica, and is administered from Toronto, Ontario. There is also an office in Chicago, Illinois.

History 
All Saints University School of Medicine was founded in April 2006. The Roseau campus opened in 2006. The student body grew steadily over the past decade and now welcomes hundreds of students. Dr. Terrence Marcelle is currently the Executive Dean of the university.

Curriculum 
Medical programs are open to national and international students. Citizens of Dominica automatically receive 50% scholarships.

5 Year MD Program 
The 5 Year MD Program is designed for recent high school graduates seeking direct admission into the study of medicine. The program consists of 4 semesters of premedical courses, including Biology, General Chemistry, Organic Chemistry, Physics, Math, and Introductory Anatomy. This is followed by the structured curriculum in the 4 Year MD Program.

4 Year MD Program 
The 4 Year MD Program is for applicants who have completed a Bachelor of Science or the necessary prerequisites at an accredited school. The program consists of 2 years in basic sciences that are conducted at the Dominica campus. This is followed by 2 years of clinical clerkship in ACGME-approved teaching hospitals throughout the United States, Canada, United Kingdom, and the Caribbean. During this period, students must complete a minimum of 72 weeks in clinical rotations. The rotations take place in the fields of Internal Medicine, General Surgery, Pediatrics, Psychiatry, Obstetrics/Gynecology, and Family Practice.

Clinical Clerkship 
Students may complete their clinical rotations in the following affiliated teaching hospitals and among a number of other approved medical institutions across the world.

Accreditation
All Saints University School of Medicine was accredited in 2019 by the ACCM (Accreditation Commission of Colleges of Medicine).

All Saints University School of Medicine is chartered and recognized by the Government of the Commonwealth of Dominica. The school is authorized to confer degrees in Doctor of Medicine (MD) upon its graduates, allowing eligible candidates to practice medicine in Dominica and overseas. Currently, All Saints University School of Medicine is listed in the International Medical Education Directory (IMED). The institution is also recognized by the Educational Commission for Foreign Medical Graduates (ECFMG), Foundation for Advancement of International Medical Education and Research (FAIMER), and the World Health Organization (WHO).

All Saints University School of Medicine is also on the Canadian Government's List of Designated Educational Institutions.

See also 
 List of Medical Schools in the Caribbean

References

External links
All Saints University School of Medicine official site

Educational institutions established in 2006
Medical schools in Dominica
Medical schools in the Caribbean
Universities and colleges in Dominica
2006 establishments in Dominica